Nelson Strait is the name of a waterway and can refer to:

Nelson Strait (South Shetland Islands), a sea passage between Robert and Nelson Islands in South Shetland, Antarctica
Nelson Strait (Chile), a sea passage between islands of the Chilean Archipelago

See also 
Nelson Channel, a sea passage in the South Sandwich Islands, previously known as "Nelson Strait"